Robert Bulkeley may refer to:
 Robert Bulkeley, 2nd Viscount Bulkeley (died 1688), MP for  Anglesey 1660–61, Caernarvonshire 1675–79, and Anglesey 1685–89
 Robert Bulkeley (died 1702), son of 2nd Viscount, MP for Beaumaris 1701–02
 Robert J. Bulkley (1880–1965), American Congressman and Senator from Ohio